ACTL may refer to:

 The American College of Trial Lawyers, a professional association of trial lawyers from the US and Canada
 The Azienda comunale dei trasporti della Città di Lugano, a former transport operator in Lugano, Switzerland
Actel Corporation, a semiconductor manufacturer based in California, US (former NASDAQ code ACTL)
 The Iveco ACTL, a military transport vehicle produced by Iveco for the Italian Army